Days of Future Passed Live is a live album by The Moody Blues that consists of their live performance at the Sony Centre for the Performing Arts in Toronto in 2017. The album was released on 23 March 2018.

The performance was the first time in the band's history that they had played the entire Days of Future Passed album live, and is particularly notable for the inclusion of songs written by Mike Pinder, whose material has seldom been included in the band's live sets since his 1978 departure.  Justin Hayward and John Lodge, respectively, sing lead on two songs that were originally sung by Pinder ("Dawn is a Feeling" and "The Sunset").  Noted British actor Jeremy Irons takes over Pinder's narration for the bookend poems "Morning Glory" and "Late Lament".  On songs written by Ray Thomas (who retired from the band in 2002), Hayward and Lodge share lead vocals on "Another Morning", and Hayward sings "Twilight Time".  The performance alters the album's sequence slightly, placing "Late Lament" before "Nights in White Satin".

Track listing

Disc one
"I'm Just a Singer (In a Rock and Roll Band)"
"The Voice"
"Steppin’ in a Slide Zone"
"Say It With Love"
"Nervous"
"Your Wildest Dreams"
"Isn't Life Strange"
"I Know You're Out There Somewhere"
"The Story in Your Eyes"

Disc two
"The Day Begins"
"Morning Glory"
"Dawn (Prelude)"
Dawn is a Feeling
"The Morning (Prelude)"
"Another Morning"
"Lunch Break (Prelude)"
"Peak Hour"
"Tuesday Afternoon (Forever Afternoon)"
"Evening (Time to Get Away)"
"The Sunset (Prelude)"
"The Sunset"
"Twilight (Prelude)"
"Twilight Time"
"Late Lament"
"Nights in White Satin"
"The Night (Finale)"
"Question"
"Ride My See-Saw"

Blu-ray/DVD only 
The Moody Blues Remember Days Of Future Passed

Personnel
Justin Hayward: vocals, guitars
John Lodge: vocals, bass
Graeme Edge: drums, percussion

Additional personnel
Norda Mullen: flute, guitars, percussion, vocals
Alan Hewitt: keyboards, vocals
Julie Ragins: keyboards, guitars, percussion, saxophone, vocals
Billy Ashbaugh: drums, percussion
Jeremy Irons: narrator
Elliot Davis: orchestral director/arrangements
Toronto World Festival Orchestra

References

The Moody Blues live albums
2018 live albums
Eagle Records live albums